"Prince Igor" is a 1997 song inspired by the Polovtsian Dances of Borodin's opera Prince Igor. It was released as the lead single from the album, The Rapsody Overture in October 1997. The main vocals are performed by Warren G, the Russian refrain by acclaimed Norwegian soprano Sissel Kyrkjebø and the instrumental background is provided by The Rapsody. Warren G uses the same rap lyrics as in his song "Reality", available on the album Take a Look Over Your Shoulder. "Prince Igor" was very successful in Europe, peaking at number-one in both Iceland and Norway. In addition, the single reached the top 10 in Belgium, Denmark, Finland, France, Germany, Greece, the Netherlands and Sweden. On the Eurochart Hot 100, the song peaked at number six in January 1998. Outside Europe, it peaked at number 41 in New Zealand.

Critical reception
Pan-European magazine Music & Media wrote, "Maybe it had to happen at some point... so blame the Voelker brothers (Achim and Klaus), a German production team who initially came up with the unlikely idea of an album combining rap with opera. This is the first single to be taken from the resulting long player, The Rapsody Overture: Hip Hop Meets Classics (due on November 3). The single uses Borodin's Prince Igor as a foundation over which Warren G raps and Norwegian folk singer Sissel provides "classical" vocals." 

Programme director Marc Stingl at German AC commercial station Radio Gong in Nurnberg, Bavaria considered the track to be "a perfect chartbreaker because of the combination of rap with classical music. The Rapsody is refreshingly different because this has not really been tried before and most other chart material is pretty old-fashioned." He concluded, "This could very well be a new trend-a band called Sweetbox have been quite successful over here with a similar approach."

A reviewer from Music Week gave the song three out of five, describing it as "[a] bizarre and haunting blend of hip hop and classical." The magazine's Alan Jones wrote, "Whether it's a groudbreaker or a dead-end mutant remains to be seen but The Rapsody, US rapper Warren G's collaboration with Norwegian opera star Sissel is both intriguing and appealing. Set against a heavy hip-hop beat, Warren struts his usual stuff but the rapper/vocalist combination is given a new spin by Sissel, whose pure soprano voice intones the melody from Borodin's Prince Igor".

Track list
"Prince Igor" (Radio Edit) (3:52) 
"Prince Igor" (Ries Class Jazz Edit) (4:03) 
"Prince Igor" (Ries 7" Remix) (3:54) 
"Prince Igor" (Album Version) (4:24) 
"Prince Igor" (Ries Class Jazz Extended) (6:08) 
"Prince Igor" (Ries Class Jazz Instrumental) (4:01)

Charts

Weekly charts

Year-end charts

References

Songs about princes
1997 singles
Hip hop songs
Number-one singles in Iceland
Number-one singles in Norway
1997 songs
Sissel Kyrkjebø songs
Def Jam Recordings singles
Songs written by Warren G
Macaronic songs